The 1918–19 season was the 42nd Scottish football season in which Dumbarton competed at national level, entering the Scottish Football League and the Victory Cup, marking the end of the Great War.  In addition Dumbarton entered the Dumbartonshire Cup, the Dumbartonshire Charity Cup and the Clydebank Charity Cup.

Scottish League 

This was the fifth (and last) season of war-time football, where the playing of all national competitions, other than the Scottish League, was suspended.  Membership of the League was increased from 18 to 22, with the re-admission of Aberdeen, Dundee and Raith Rovers, together with the addition of Albion Rovers.

Dumbarton finished 15th out of 18, in the League with 22 points, well behind champions Celtic. This was their worst performance in a number of years, perhaps not unsurprising given the large turnover in playing staff. Most concerning during the season was the inability to score goals, as in 17 of the 34 league matches, Dumbarton failed to 'find the net'.

Victory Cup
To mark the end of the Great War, a Victory Cup was played for - but Dumbarton were beaten in the first round by the eventual winners, St Mirren, after a 0-0 draw.

Dumbartonshire Cup
The Dumbartonshire Cup returned to a 'round robin' qualifying process, but by winning only one tie, failed to qualify for the final.

Final league table

Dumbartonshire Charity Cup
Dumabrton lost out in the final of the Dumbartonshire Charity Cup to Dumbarton Harp.

Clydebank Charity Cup
Dumbarton lost out in the final of the inaugural Clydebank Charity Cup to hosts Clydebank.

Player statistics

Squad 

|}

Source:

Transfers

Players in

Players out 

Source:

In addition Hugh Cairney, Joh McMeekin and Fred Williams all played their final 'first XI' games in Dumbarton colours.

References

Dumbarton F.C. seasons
Scottish football clubs 1918–19 season